Tom Macaulay (17 March 1906 - 19 June 1979) was a British actor. Born  Chambré Thomas MacAulay Booth, and Harrow educated, he was married to the actress Tucker McGuire.

Selected filmography
 I See a Dark Stranger (1946) - Lieut. Spanswick
 The Chiltern Hundreds (1949) - Cleghorn
 The Woman in Question (1950) - Flashy Man (uncredited)
 The Long Dark Hall (1951) - Ironworks manager
 Mother Riley Meets the Vampire (1952) - Robot Mark 1
 Penny Princess (1952) - Grieves (uncredited)
 The Planter's Wife (1952) - Jack Bushell
 Murder at Scotland Yard (1953) - Insp. Grant
 Skid Kids (1953) - (uncredited)

References

External links

1906 births
1979 deaths
British male film actors
British male television actors
Male actors from London
20th-century British male actors